Pamela Floro-Worthington (born 18 August 1979) is a Filipino former professional tennis player.

Floro, a native of Manila, was a Southeast Asian Games and Fed Cup representative for the Philippines. While playing for the Philippines Fed Cup team in 1997 and 1998 she amassed four doubles wins, all partnering Jennifer Saret.

Leaving the tour in 1998, Floro spent the next period of her career in collegiate tennis. She started out at Southern Illinois University, before transferring to the University of Maryland after her sophomore season.

References

External links
 
 
 

1979 births
Living people
Filipino female tennis players
Southern Illinois Salukis athletes
Maryland Terrapins women's tennis players
Southeast Asian Games medalists in tennis
Southeast Asian Games silver medalists for the Philippines
Southeast Asian Games bronze medalists for the Philippines
Competitors at the 1997 Southeast Asian Games
Competitors at the 1999 Southeast Asian Games
Sportspeople from Manila